James Ibbetson, D.D., J.P. (1717–1781) was Archdeacon of St Albans in the Church of England from 13 September 1754 until his death on 12 August 1781.

Life
He was the son of Ebenezer Ibbetson, of the parish of St Martin, Ludgate in the City of London, a silk merchant who imported mantuas from the Netherlands. He matriculated at Exeter College, Oxford in 1734, at age 16. He was a Fellow of the college from 1737 to 1749, graduating B.A. in 1740 and M.A. in 1741. He received the divinity degrees of B.D. in 1748 and D.D. in 1752.

Ibbetson was the  incumbent at Merton, Oxfordshire in 1747. He was then presented to Bushey, Hertfordshire in 1748, by his father, who had a limited patronage under the will of Grace Smith.

Works
A Plea for the subscription of the Clergy to the thirty-nine articles of religion (1767). This work was an early criticism of the proposals by Francis Blackburne to relax the religious tests in the Church of England.

Family
Ibbetson's children included:

 James (1755–1790), a barrister, and the husband of Agnes Ibbetson, the plant physiologist.
 Denzil (born 1756/7), cleric who became rector of Halstead.
 Charlotte, second daughter, married William Boscawen.

References

External links 

 James Ibbetson papers, 1746-1775 at Pitts Theology Library, Candler School of Theology

1717 births
People from the City of London
Alumni of Exeter College, Oxford
Archdeacons of St Albans
1781 deaths